Gilks is a surname. Notable people with the surname may include:

Alfred Gilks (1891–1970), cinematographer
Bob Gilks (1864–1944), baseball player
Gillian Gilks (born 1950), badminton player
Martin Gilks (1965–2006), musician
Matthew Gilks (born 1982), football player

See also
Gilkes